Jacques Dago (born 10 March 1999) is an Ivorian footballer who plays as a forward for Spanish club Marbella FC, on loan from CF Talavera de la Reina.

Club career
Having joined CF Fuenlabrada in 2021, Dago was initially assigned to the reserves in the regional leagues, and scored four times in only eight matches. He made his first team debut on 15 August 2021, coming on as a late substitute for Aboubakary Kanté in a 1–2 home loss against CD Tenerife, in the Segunda División.

On 14 July 2022, Dago joined Tercera División RFEF side Marbella FC, on loan from CF Talavera de la Reina.

References

External links

1999 births
Living people
Ivorian footballers
Association football forwards
Segunda División players
Tercera Federación players
Divisiones Regionales de Fútbol players
CF Fuenlabrada B players
CF Fuenlabrada footballers
CF Talavera de la Reina players
Marbella FC players
Ivorian expatriate footballers
Ivorian expatriate sportspeople in Spain
Expatriate footballers in Spain